The Cheese Country Trail is a  multi-use rail trail in south central Wisconsin.

The trail stretches from Monroe to Mineral Point, connecting Browntown, South Wayne, Gratiot, Darlington, and Calamine.  The trail is used with ATVs, bicycles, horses, snowmobiles, and hikers.

Location
 Eastern terminus with parking at NW corner of 21st St. and 4th Av. West in Monroe.
 Northern terminus at Mineral Point Depot on Old Darlington Rd in Mineral Point.

External links
WDNR news release on trail status
Lafayette County trail information

Rail trails in Wisconsin
Protected areas of Green County, Wisconsin
Protected areas of Lafayette County, Wisconsin